Hans Kaupmannsennecke (born 23 April 1937) is a German former sports shooter. He competed in the 50 metre pistol event at the 1964 Summer Olympics.

References

External links
 

1937 births
Living people
German male sport shooters
Olympic shooters of the United Team of Germany
Shooters at the 1964 Summer Olympics
Sportspeople from Hamm